Justin Lewis is a Professor of Communication and Creative Industries at the Cardiff School of Journalism, Media and Cultural Studies at Cardiff University. He is the Director of Clwstwr, an Arts and Humanities Research Council and Welsh Government funded Research & Development innovation centre for the Screen and News sectors and media.cymru, a £50 million, 23 partner consortium, funded by UK Research and Innovation, Cardiff Capital Region and Welsh Government, designed to boost inclusive and sustainable media sector innovation in Wales. He is also Chief Field Editor for Frontiers in Communication, a global Open Access publisher.

He was formerly the Head of School and Dean of Research for the School of Journalism, Media and Culture at Cardiff University. In 2012, while in this role, he established the Centre for Community Journalism. In 2015, he became a co-founder of Creative Cardiff, with Ian Hargreaves, a network that connects people working in any creative organisation, business or job in the Cardiff region.

He has written widely about media, culture and politics. His books, since 2000, include Constructing Public Opinion  (New York: Columbia University Press, 2001), Citizens or Consumers: What the media tell us about political participation (Open University Press, 2005), Shoot First and Ask Questions Later: Media Coverage of the War in Iraq (Peter Lang, 2006), Climate Change and the Media (Peter Lang, 2009), The world of 24-hour news (Peter Lang, 2010) and Beyond Consumer Capitalism: Media and the Limits to Imagination (Polity, 2013).

He has written articles for The Guardian and is a regular commentator on media, politics and cultural issues for regional and national US and UK media, including BBC Radio 5 Live, the Today programme, BBC News, The Independent, The Washington Post, the NBC Today Show, and National Public Radio.

Professor Lewis presented at the 2012 TEDxCardiff conference on the subject of consumer capitalism and the impact on media and communications.

Publications 
 Art - Who Needs It?, co-authored with David Morley and Russell Southwood. London: Comedia, 1986.
 Art, Culture and Enterprise: the Politics of the Cultural Industries, London: Routledge, 1990.
 The Ideological Octopus: An Exploration of Television and its Audience, New York: Routledge, 1991.
 Enlightened Racism: The Cosby Show, Audiences and the Myth of the American Dream, co-authored with Sut Jhally. Boulder: Westview Press, 1992.
 Viewing, Reading, Listening: Essays in Cultural Reception, co- edited with Jon Cruz. Boulder: Boulder: Westview Press, 1994.
 Constructing Public Opinion: how political elites do what they like and why we seem to go along with it, New York: Columbia University Press, 2001.
 Television Studies: The Key Concepts, co-authored with Bernadette Casey, Neil Casey, Ben Calvert and Liam French, London: Routledge, 2001.
 Cultural Policy: A Critical Reader, co-written and edited with Toby Miller, Malden, MA: Blackwell, 2002.
 Misleading media reporting? The MMR story, co-written with Tammy Boyce, Nature Reviews Immunology 3(11), pp. 913-918. Nature Publishing Group, 2003. 
 Citizens or Consumers: The Media and the Decline of Political Participation, co-authored with Sanna Inthorn and Karin Wahl-Jorgensen, Open University Press, 2005.
 Shoot First and Ask Questions Later: Media Coverage of the War in Iraq, co-authored with Rod Brookes, Nick Mosdell and Terry Threadgold, Peter Lang, 2006.
 Climate change and the media: the scale of the challenge. In: Boyce, Tammy and Lewis - Climate Change and the Media, Global Crises and the Media, vol. 5. New York, NY: Peter Lang, pp. 3-16, 2008.
 Television Studies: The Key Concepts, co-authored with Bernadette Casey, Neil Casey, Ben Calvert and Liam French, London: Routledge, 2001, 2nd edition, 2008.
 Prioritizing hand-shaking over policy-making: A study of how the 2007 devolved elections was reported on BBC UK network coverage, co-authored with Stephen Cushion and Christopher Groves. Cyfrwng: Media Wales Journal 6, pp. 7-32, 2009.

References 

 https://www.cardiff.ac.uk/people/view/182947-lewis-justin

British mass media scholars
Living people
Academics of Cardiff University
University of Massachusetts Amherst faculty
Year of birth missing (living people)